The 2001 World Youth Championships in Athletics was the second edition of the World Youth Championships in Athletics. It was held in Debrecen, Hungary 12–15 July 2001.

Results

Boys

Girls

Medal table

References

External links
 results
Official IAAF site

2001
World Youth Championships in Athletics
Athletics
International athletics competitions hosted by Hungary
IAAF World Youth Championships in Athletics
2001 in youth sport